The Hafner Rotabuggy (formally known as the Malcolm Rotaplane and as the "M.L. 10/42 Flying Jeep") was a British experimental aircraft that was essentially a Willys MB combined with a rotor kite, developed with the intention of producing a way of air-dropping off-road vehicles.

Design and development
It was designed by Raoul Hafner of the Airborne Forces Experimental Establishment (AFEE) after their development of the Rotachute enjoyed some success.

The prototype was built by the R. Malcolm & Co. Ltd (also producer of the Malcolm hood) at White Waltham in 1942. Air Ministry specification 10/42 for a "Special Rotating Wing Glider" was used to identify the project.

Initial testing showed that a Willys MB could be dropped from heights up to  without damage to the vehicle. A  diameter rotor was attached, along with a tail fairing and fins, but no rudders. Two men were required to pilot the aircraft: one to drive it as an automobile, and one to pilot it in the air using a control column. Initially it was named the "Blitz Buggy", but that was soon dropped for the "Rotabuggy".

The first trial was conducted on 16 November 1943, with the unit being towed behind a Diamond T lorry, but the lorry could not get enough speed to put the Rotabuggy in the air. A more powerful vehicle, a supercharged 4.5-litre Bentley automobile, was used on 27 November to finally allow the machine to become airborne and in test could obtain glide speeds of 45 mph. Later tests were made towed behind an Armstrong-Whitworth Whitley bomber.

However, the introduction of gliders that could carry vehicles (such as the Waco Hadrian and Airspeed Horsa) made the Rotabuggy superfluous and further development was cancelled.

A replica of the Rotabuggy is displayed at the Museum of Army Flying in Middle Wallop. Hafner also came up with the idea of a similarly outfitted "Rotatank" using a Valentine tank, but that was never built.

Specifications

See also
Baynes Bat
Flying tank

References
Notes

Sources

Bibliography

External links
Museum of Army Flying exhibit
Unrealaircraft.com

Autogyros
Rotor kites
1940s British experimental aircraft
Roadable aircraft
Aircraft first flown in 1943